Patrik Popov (born 12 October 1997, in Budapest) is a Hungarian football player who currently plays for FC Dabas. He was also part of the Hungarian U-20 team at the 2015 FIFA U-20 World Cup.

Club statistics

Updated to games played as of 2 December 2014.

References

External links

Patrik Popov profile at magyarfutball.hu 

1997 births
Living people
Footballers from Budapest
Hungarian footballers
Hungary youth international footballers
Association football forwards
Ferencvárosi TC footballers
Soroksár SC players
Rákospalotai EAC footballers
FC Dabas footballers
Nemzeti Bajnokság I players
Nemzeti Bajnokság II players